Rodd Keith (born Rodney Keith Eskelin; January 30, 1937 – December 15, 1974) was an American multi-instrumentalist and songwriter. He is perhaps the best known figure in the obscure musical subgenre known as song poem music.

Life and career
He worked for several companies active in the song poem business, a practice also known as song sharking, and generally dismissed as a scam.

Keith recorded hundreds of musical compositions based around lyrics sent in to song-poem companies by amateur songwriters, based upon small ads in the backs of mass market magazines promising success in the profitable field of songwriting.  After a letter was sent by the company, the amateur songwriters would then be convinced to pay the company a fee to have a recording made and records pressed. Keith sang on many of these recordings as well as playing several different instruments, including saxophone, melodica, and all manner of keyboards.  His earliest song-poem work was made for Sandy Stanton's Film City label in which he would build the entire track using a Chamberlin keyboard (a precursor to the mellotron).  These early recordings have a woozy, distinctive sound that are like nothing else before or since.

During the late 1960s he had his most prolific period working for Clarence Freed's Preview Records label in Los Angeles. Keith masterminded recording sessions for hundreds of 45s and dozens of albums, working with female singers Teri Thornton, Charlotte O'Hara, and Nita Garfield (who used "noms de disque" Teri Summers/Teri Marsh/Terri North, Bonnie Graham, and Nita Craig respectively). Thornton, a promising jazz vocalist in the late 1950s and early 1960s, had fallen on hard times, while the latter two were ambitious singers and songwriters who had had material recorded in the C&W and R&B markets.

Musically, Rodd Keith seemed at home and completely convincing in a wide variety of musical idioms, becoming almost chameleon-like (an attribute that not all song-poem performers shared).  That said, his music is distinctive, with strong melodic hooks, dazzling keyboard playing, highly inventive (and sometimes lush) arrangements, and (depending on the musical style) a wide vocal vibrato.  His music has many "eras", starting with the early Chamberlin recordings for the Film City label, elaborate jazzy arrangements for his early Preview records, and shambolic yet often compelling mellotron-drenched recordings for his later career.  His recordings run the gamut of all the various subgenres of jazz, rock & roll, country, funk, soul and religious music.

Keith, who was born into a religious household and was even a musical evangelist for a time, fell in with a hard-living crowd in Los Angeles during the late 1960s and early 1970s, experimenting with different psychedelics.  In December 1974, by which time he had moved over to Maury S. Rosen's MSR Records, Keith met his death on the Hollywood Freeway in Los Angeles.  According to an article in the Los Angeles Times (which ran on December 15, 1974) Keith was seen "leaping or falling from an overcrossing onto the Hollywood Freeway," and he "plunged down the Santa Monica Blvd. overpass onto the northbound freeway about 5:15 a.m. and drivers could not avoid him."  It has been suggested that this was a suicidal act, but Keith's heavy drug use at this time has led others to claim it was an accident.

In the 1990s, record collectors who seek out old vinyl recordings rediscovered these obscure discs. Several compilations of these songs were released on compact disc, including several which featured the work of Keith exclusively.  Keith's son, avant-garde saxophonist Ellery Eskelin, provided commentary on these releases.  Although Eskelin never actually met his father, he was told by many people that he was some kind of musical genius.  Keith once remarked that he spelled "Rodd" with two d's because "God only used one."

This American Life, an NPR show, had an interview with Ellery Eskelin, who spoke about his discovery of his father's works.  This show originally aired August 15, 1997.

Partial discography
I Died Today, Rodd Keith (Tzadik)
Ecstacy To Frenzy, Rodd Keith (Tzadik)
Saucers in the Sky, Rodd Keith (Roaratorio)
My Pipe Yellow Dream, Rodd Keith (Roaratorio)
Black Phoenix Blues, Rodd Keith (Roaratorio)

References

External links
http://www.wfmu.org/LCD/18/rodd.html

1974 deaths
1937 births
American multi-instrumentalists
American male songwriters
Tzadik Records artists
20th-century American musicians
20th-century American male musicians